Temple Beth Israel is located in Stevens Point, Wisconsin. It was added to the National Register of Historic Places in 2007.

The building is now a museum known as the Beth Israel Synagogue and is operated by the Portage County Historical Society. Displays include Jewish religious practices and the history of the Stevens Point Jewish community.

History
The structure is the third oldest synagogue in Wisconsin. It underwent remodeling in 1951.

References

External links
 Beth Israel Synagogue - Portage County Historical Society

Synagogues in Wisconsin
Buildings and structures in Portage County, Wisconsin
Synagogues completed in 1905
Museums in Portage County, Wisconsin
National Register of Historic Places in Portage County, Wisconsin
Synagogues on the National Register of Historic Places in Wisconsin
1905 establishments in Wisconsin